Jerome Martin Fleishman (February 14, 1922 – June 20, 2007) was an American professional basketball player.

A 6'2" shooting guard from New York University, Fleishman played five seasons (1946–1950; 1952–1953) in the Basketball Association of America/National Basketball Association as a member of the Philadelphia Warriors and New York Knicks. He averaged 5.8 points per game in his BAA/NBA career and won a league championship in 1947.

BAA/NBA career statistics

Regular season

Playoffs

External links

All-American college men's basketball players
American men's basketball players
Jewish men's basketball players
New York Knicks players
NYU Violets men's basketball players
Philadelphia Sphas players
Philadelphia Warriors players
Shooting guards
Small forwards
Basketball players from New York City
20th-century American Jews
21st-century American Jews
1922 births
2007 deaths